Kirsten Strange-Campbell (born 14 July 1944) is a retired Danish swimmer. She competed at the 1964, 1968 and 1972 Summer Olympics in the 100 m and 200 m freestyle and 200 m and 400 m medley events (eight in total), but failed to reach the final in any of them.

References

1944 births
Living people
Danish female medley swimmers
Danish female freestyle swimmers
Olympic swimmers of Denmark
Swimmers at the 1964 Summer Olympics
Swimmers at the 1968 Summer Olympics
Swimmers at the 1972 Summer Olympics
Sportspeople from Frederiksberg